Richard Ian Cox (born October 3, 1973) is a Welsh-born Canadian actor, comedian and online radio host. He is best known for his voice work for English language dubs of anime, mainly for Inuyasha. Cox gained prominence for playing the character of Henry Dailey's (played by Mickey Rooney) teenaged traveller and horse rider, Alec Ramsay, in The Family Channel's Adventures of the Black Stallion during the early 1990s. Cox also gained fame for voicing Ian Kelley, the title character in the animated series Being Ian and for voicing Scattershot, one of the Autobots in the CGI-Animated series Transformers: Cybertron. In 2015, he provided the voice of Lofty in the American dubbed version of the 2015 reboot of the British children's animated television series Bob the Builder taking over from both Sonya Leite and Emma Tate. He had a prominent live action role alongside Robin Williams in the 2006 comedy RV. He maintains an active online presence on Tumblr and Twitter as well as Facebook. He hosts his own podcast called The Show.

Career
Born in St. Asaph, Wales, Cox began acting at the age of 9. He moved to Vancouver, British Columbia, Canada and at age 14 became a professional actor. After graduating from Vancouver's Richmond Secondary School in 1991, he appeared in a wide variety of guest-starring roles. He is most commonly known for his voice work of Bit Cloud in Zoids: New Century Zero, Ranma Saotome (male) in the later seasons of Ranma ½, and as the title character of InuYasha, which are both series based on the original manga works of Rumiko Takahashi.

By the time he was 16, he won the co-starring role in Black Stallion, opposite Mickey Rooney, where he worked for much of his youth. The two remained close friends, until Rooney's death, in April 2014. He has also voiced various characters in several other anime series, including Mobile Suit Gundam (Kai Shiden), Galaxy Angel (Normad), Megaman NT Warrior (Burner Man) and Gundam SEED (Tolle Koenig and Shani Andras), as well as various American cartoon characters, such as Quicksilver in X-Men: Evolution and Snails in My Little Pony: Friendship is Magic.

Based in Vancouver, Canada, Cox has made a few guest appearances in Stargate SG-1 and its spin-off Stargate Atlantis, as well as bit parts in series such as ER and Psych. He has also appeared on the Canadian television show The Outer Limits and voices Bedtime Bear in Care Bears: Adventures in Care-a-Lot.

For over a decade, Cox was a senior instructor of actors at Tarlington Training in Vancouver, and currently teaches film acting at South Delta Secondary School.

He hosts The Show, an online radio show.

Roles

Voice-over roles
 .hack//Roots (2006) – Itta (English version)
 Action Man (1995–1996) – Jacques
 Asterix: The Mansions of the Gods (2014) - Squaronthehypotenus (English version)
 Battle Assault 3 Featuring Gundam SEED (2004) (uncredited)
 Barbie and the Secret Door (2014) – Whiff 
 Being Ian (2005–2008) – Ian Kelley, Kid #1, Fan #8, Golfer, Ian's Louse, Headbanger, Police Chief, Green-Capped Sailor
 Bob the Builder (2015–2017) – Lofty (US)
 Bob the Builder: Mega Machines (2017) – Lofty (US)
 Boys Over Flowers (1996) - Red-haired Thug (English version, ep. 32)
 Care Bears: Adventures In Care-A-Lot (2007–2008) – Bedtime Bear
 Dragalia Lost (2018) – Ranzal, Rex, Yaten
 Dinotrux (2015) – Revvit, additional voices
 Dragon Ball Z – Zaacro, Spice (voice)
 Dragon Drive (2004) – Kouhei Toki (voice)
 Dragon Tales (1999) – Mefirst Wizard (Red Hat)
 Dynasty Warriors: Gundam (2007) – Kai Shiden (English version)
 Dynasty Warriors: Gundam 2 (2008) – Kai Shiden (English version)
 Dynasty Warriors: Gundam 3 (2010) – Allelujah Haptism, Kai Shiden (English version)
 Fat Dog Mendoza (1998) – Additional Voices
 Firehouse Tales (2005) – Crabby
 Galaxy Angel (2004) – Normad
 Geronimo Stilton (2010) – Trap Stilton
 Green Legend Ran (1992) (voice: English version)
 Hamtaro – Kip, Sabu
 Hurricanes (1993) – Additional Voices
 Infinite Ryvius (1999) – Gran McDaniel and additional characters (English version)
 InuYasha: Feudal Combat (2005) – Inuyasha (English version)
 InuYasha the Movie: Affections Touching Across Time (2001) – InuYasha (English version)
 InuYasha the Movie: The Castle Beyond the Looking Glass (2002) – Inuyasha (English version)
 InuYasha the Movie: Fire on the Mystic Island (2004) – InuYasha (English version)
 InuYasha the Movie: Swords of an Honorable Ruler (2003) – InuYasha (English version)
 InuYasha: The Final Act (2010) – Inuyasha (English version)
 InuYasha: The Secret of the Cursed Mask (2004) InuYasha (English version)
 InuYasha (2000) – InuYasha, Young InuYasha, Buyo the Cat (English version) (seasons 1–5 as Richard Cox then Season 6+ as Richard Ian Cox)
 LeapFrog – Additional voices
 Logical Journey of the Zoombinis (1996) – Narrator
 Max Steel (2013) – Kirby Kowalski
 MegaMan: NT Warrior (2002–2003) – NoodleMan.EXE, BurnerMan.EXE (English version)
 Mobile Suit Gundam 00 (2008) – Allelujah Haptism (English version)
 Mobile Suit Gundam SEED (2002) – Tolle Koenig, Shani Andras (English version)
 Mobile Suit Gundam: Encounters in Space (2003) – Kai Shiden (English version)
 Mobile Suit Gundam: Federation vs. Zeon (2001) – Kai Shiden (English version)
 Mobile Suit Gundam: Zeonic Front (2001) – Kai Shiden (English version)
 Mobile Suit Gundam (1979) – Kai Shiden
 Monkey Magic (1998) (English version)
 Monster Rancher (2000) – Niton, Tainted Cat Brother #2
 My Little Pony: Friendship Is Magic (2010) – Snails, Dumb-Bell, Clump, Grampa Gruff, Featherweight
 My Little Pony: Equestria Girls (2013) – Snails
 My Little Pony: Equestria Girls - Rainbow Rocks (2014) – Snails
 My Little Pony: Equestria Girls – Legend of Everfree (2016) – Snails
 My Little Pony: Pony Life (2020-present) – Snails
 My Little Pony Tales (1992) – Coach, Referee, Photographer Pony, Mr. Sweetheart, Mr. Berrytown, Postman, Mr. Clover, Dustman, Fisherman, Rollerskate Contest Judge, Mr. Bon Bon, Mr. Tidwell, Wedding Guests 1, 2 and 3, Vicar, Cake Shop Owner, Cheval, Chief, Mr. Kidoo, Mayor of Ponyland, Director, Vet, Spot, Mr. Patch, King of the Isle of Pony, Usher, Yorkie, Farm Judge, Mr. Meadowsweet, Fairground Stall Holder
 Nana – Ginpei
 Powerpuff Girls Z (2006) – Top Hat, Big Balled Billy (Big Boy), Noodlehead
 Ranma ½ (1989) – Ranma Saotome (male) (English version) (seasons 4–7)
 RoboCop: Alpha Commando (1998) – Additional Voices
 Shelldon – Herman
 Silverwing (2003) – Orestes
 Spy Kids: Mission Critical (2018) – Sir Awesome
 Supernoobs (2015) – Kevin
 The Little Prince – as Eenymeeny' (May 27, 2012 dubbing episodes 24–25, The Planet of Carapodes arc)
 Tom and Jerry Tales (2006) - Sheldon
 Transformers Cybertron (2005) – Scattorshot (voice)
 Trouble Chocolate (2000) – Cacao 
 Warhammer 40,000: Dawn of War (2004) – Heretics, Cultists, Bonesingers, Guardians, Rangers, Dark Reapers, Warp Spiders, Falcon Grav Tanks, Vypers, Fire Prisms, Wraithlords and Avatars of Khaine
 Will & Dewitt (2007–2008) – Dewitt
 X-Men: Evolution (2000) – Quicksilver 
 Yashahime: Princess Half-Demon (2020) - InuYasha (English version)
 Zoids: New Century Zero (2001) – Bit Cloud (English version)
  Zoids Wild  (2018) - Master Bug (English Version)

Live-action roles
 The Adventures of the Black Stallion (1990) – Alec Ramsay
 Alive: The Miracle of the Andes (1993) - Moncho Sabella
 Blood Angels (2004) – Rennie
 Breaker High (1997) – Tony
 The Christmas Clause (2008) – Morris
 Cold Squad (1999–2000)
 Eureka (2007) - Dr. Bob Stone (as Richard Cox)
 Ghost Rider (2007) – Helicopter Pilot (as Richard Cox) 
 H-E Double Hockey Sticks (1999)
 The Mrs. Clause (2008) – Morris
 My 5 Wives (2000) (as Richard Cox)
 The New Addams Family (1990s) – Smedley
 Postal (2007) – Coffee Customer
 Pants on Fire (2013)
 Project Mc2 (2017) – Professor Kato
 Psych (2006) – Desk Clerk Bobby
 Recipe for Love (2014) – Kitchen Knockout Judge #1
 Runaway Virus (2000)
 RV (2006) – Laird
 Snowbound: The Jim and Jennifer Stolpa Story (1994) – Jason Wicker
 Stargate Atlantis (2005) – Dr. Brendan Gaul
 Stargate SG-1 (2000) – Nyan
 The Stickup (2001)

References

External links
Official website

Richard Ian Cox's official podcast

1973 births
Living people
Canadian male film actors
Canadian male television actors
Canadian male voice actors
Canadian schoolteachers
Canadian talk radio hosts
Male actors from Vancouver
Naturalized citizens of Canada
People from St Asaph
Welsh emigrants to Canada
Welsh male film actors
Welsh male television actors
Welsh male voice actors
20th-century Canadian male actors
21st-century Canadian male actors
20th-century Welsh male actors
21st-century Welsh male actors